Mount Bindango is a rural locality in the Maranoa Region, Queensland, Australia. In the  Mount Bindango had a population of 33 people.

Geography 
The Warrego Highway forms the southern boundary of the locality, entering the locality from Hodgson/Mount Abundance to the east and exiting to Muckadilla in the south-west. The Western railway line runs parallel and immediately north of the highway.

Brinsop was a neighbourhood that developed around the now-abandoned Brinsop railway station on the Western railway line in the south-west of the locality. The abandoned Bindango railway station was also on the Western railway line on the southern boundary of the locality.

Ona Ona was a neighbourhood. that developed around the Ona Ona railway station on the now-closed Injune railway line.

There are two named peaks, close together in the north-west of the locality:

The land use is agricultural, mostly grazing on native vegetation, and there are a number of homesteads in the locality:

 Bindango
 Coonong
 Glen Alva
Goldsborough
 Keele Downs
 Myrong
 Norolle
 North Bindango

History 
The locality takes its name from the mountain, which was named on 11 May 1846 by the Surveyor-General of New South Wales, Thomas Mitchell, based on the name given to him by Aboriginal informants. Mount Bindyego was also named by Mitchell on the same day based on the name provided by Aboriginal informants.

The name Brinsop comes from the village of Brinsop in Herefordshire, England, which possibly means brown valley (brun/hop).

The name Ona Ona was assigned on 29 April 1915 by the Queensland Railways Department, an Aboriginal phrase, meaning boxtree flat.

An infant was burnt to death in the resulting fire. Investigations revealed that the points had been deliberately changed from the main railway line to divert the train into the siding. The police offered a reward of $50,000 for information leading to the person responsible. 

In the  Mount Bindango had a population of 33 people.

Education 
There are no schools in Mount Bindango. Roma State College in Roma to the east is the nearest primary and secondary school.

References 

Maranoa Region
Localities in Queensland